Plectrohyla acanthodes (commonly known as the thorny spikethumb frog) is a species of frog in the family Hylidae.
It is found in Guatemala and Mexico.
Its natural habitats are subtropical or tropical moist montane forests and rivers.
It is threatened by habitat loss.

References

Plectrohyla
Amphibians of Guatemala
Amphibians of Mexico
Amphibians described in 1992
Taxonomy articles created by Polbot